The Band is the second studio album by the Band, released on September 22, 1969. It is also known as The Brown Album. According to Rob Bowman's liner notes for the 2000 reissue, The Band has been viewed as a concept album, with the songs focusing on people, places and traditions associated with an older version of Americana. Thus, the songs on this album draw on historic themes for "The Night They Drove Old Dixie Down", "King Harvest (Has Surely Come)" and "Jawbone" (which was composed in the unusual 6/4 time signature).

Recording
After unsuccessfully attempting sessions at a studio in New York, the Band set up shop in the pool house of a home rented by the group in the Hollywood Hills located at 8850 Evanview Drive in Los Angeles, California. The home was then owned by Sammy Davis Jr. and was previously owned by Judy Garland and Wally Cox. According to Robbie Robertson, the location was chosen to give the songs a Basement Tapes–like feel in what was termed "a clubhouse concept". Three songs to finish the album (from "Up on Cripple Creek" through "Jemima Surrender") were not recorded at the "clubhouse studio", but at The Hit Factory in New York City.

According to co-producer John Simon, Robbie Robertson took over most of the engineering for the record, "hungry for knowledge ... I showed him how to make an album from a technical point of view."

Release
The album was originally released as an LP on September 22, 1969. A 1980 "Capitol 16000 Series" budget vinyl reissue of the album omitted "When You Awake" and "King Harvest (Has Surely Come)".

After several reissues on vinyl, cassette tape, and compact disc, the album was remastered and re-released with bonus tracks in 2000, in a process overseen by Robertson.

The Band was reissued in 2009 by Audio Fidelity as a limited edition gold CD. The reissue included a single B-side, "Get Up Jake", as a bonus track. "Get Up Jake", which also appears on the 2000 reissue, was slated for inclusion on the original album but was dropped from the lineup at the last minute, either because the band felt it was too similar to another track on the album or because there physically was not enough room on the album. It also was suggested that the underdeveloped status of the song made them decide against inclusion in the album. A reworked version of "Get Up Jake" was later included in many of the Band's live performances in the early 1970s and also on the 1972 live album Rock of Ages.

In 2019, a 50th Anniversary Edition was released, with an entirely new stereo mix of the album by Bob Clearmountain, mastered by Bob Ludwig, as well as several outtake tracks and the Band's entire live set from the Woodstock festival.

The original LP back cover quotes the opening lines from Shelton Brooks's 1917 composition "Darktown Strutters' Ball".

Reception

The album includes many of the Band's best-known and critically acclaimed songs, including "The Night They Drove Old Dixie Down", which Rolling Stone named the 245th-greatest song of all time (in the updated version, it was the 249th-greatest song of all time). In 2003, the album was ranked No. 45 on Rolling Stone magazine's list of the 500 greatest albums of all time, maintaining the rating in a 2012 revised list. In the 2020 update of that list, it was ranked No. 57. In 1998 Q magazine readers voted The Band the 76th greatest album of all time. Time magazine included it in their unranked 2006 list of the 100 greatest albums. Robert Christgau, having been disappointed with the Band's debut, had expected to dislike the record and even planned a column for the Village Voice to "castigate" their follow-up. Upon hearing the record, however, he declared it better than Abbey Road, which had been released four days following, writing that the Band's LP is an "A-plus record if I've ever rated one". He ranked it as the fourth-best album of the year in his ballot for Jazz & Pop magazine's annual critics poll. The album was later included in his "Basic Record Library" of 1950s and 1960s recordings, published in Christgau's Record Guide: Rock Albums of the Seventies (1981).
It was voted No. 45 in the third edition of Colin Larkin's All Time Top 1000 Albums (2000).

The Band peaked at No. 9 on Billboards Pop Albums chart. In 2000, it charted on Billboards Internet Albums chart, peaking at No. 10. The singles "Rag Mama Rag" and "Up on Cripple Creek" peaked on the Pop Singles chart at Nos. 57 and 25 respectively. The "Rag Mama Rag" single performed better in the UK, where it reached No. 16. It was the band's highest-charting album in their native Canada, peaking at number two on the Canadian Albums Chart.

On Metacritic, the expanded 50th anniversary edition of the album receives an aggregate score of 96 out of 100, based on six reviews, a rating that the website defines as indicating "universal acclaim".

PopMatters critic David Pike rated "Rockin' Chair" as one of the "41 essential pop/rock songs with accordion."Album - Billboard (United States)Singles - Billboard (United States)

In 2009, The Band was preserved into the National Recording Registry because the album was "culturally, historically, or aesthetically important, and/or informs or reflects life in the United States". It was also included in the book 1001 Albums You Must Hear Before You Die. At the 2017 Polaris Music Prize, the album won the jury vote for the Heritage Prize in the 1960-1975 category.

Track listing
All tracks written by Robbie Robertson unless noted.

Original releaseSide oneSide two2000 reissue bonus tracks

PersonnelThe Band Rick Danko – bass guitar, fiddle, trombone, vocals
 Levon Helm – drums, mandolin, rhythm guitar, vocals
 Garth Hudson – organ, clavinet, piano, accordion, melodica, soprano, tenor and baritone saxophones, slide trumpet, bass pedals
 Richard Manuel – piano, drums, baritone saxophone, harmonica, vocals
 Robbie Robertson (credited as Jaime Robbie Robertson; his full name) – electric and acoustic guitars, engineerAdditional personnel'''
 John Simon – producer, tuba, electric piano, baritone horn, tenor saxophone, "high school and peck horns", engineer
 Tony May – engineer
 Joe Zagarino – engineer
 Elliott Landy – photography
 Bob Cato – album design

See alsoClassic Albums''

References

Sources

1969 albums
The Band albums
Albums produced by John Simon (record producer)
Capitol Records albums
Concept albums
Grammy Hall of Fame Award recipients
United States National Recording Registry recordings
United States National Recording Registry albums